Sir Benjamin Tichborne, 1st Baronet (c. 1542 – 6 September 1621) was an English landowner, courtier and politician who sat in the House of Commons at various times between 1588 and 1593.  

Tichborne was the son of Nicholas Tichborne, of Tichborne, Hampshire and his second wife Elizabeth Rythe, sister of James Rythe. He was Sheriff of Hampshire from 1579 to 1580. In 1588, he was elected Member of Parliament for Petersfield. He was elected MP for Hampshire in 1593. He was knighted by Queen Elizabeth at Tichborne when she was on her way to Basing in 1601. He was Sheriff of Hampshire again from 1602 to 1603 in which capacity he proclaimed the accession of James I in March 1603 at Winchester. 

He was Gentleman of the Privy Chamber to King James, who visited Tichborne on several occasions, and gave him the Castle of Winchester in fee farm. He was created baronet on 8 March 1621. Tichborne died on 6 September 1621, in his 80s, and was buried at Tichborne, Hampshire.

Tichborne married firstly to a Miss Shelley, of Mapledurham, Oxfordshire. She died without issue. He married, secondly, by licence dated 17 May 1571, Amphillis Weston, daughter of Richard Weston, of Skreens, Essex.

Sir Benjamin had four sons and at least three daughters by his second marriage:
 Sir Richard Tichborne, 2nd Baronet
 Walter Tichborne (1580–1640), knighted, married 1597 to Mary White (c. 1581–1620) daughter of Robert White of Aldershot; Walter built Aldershot Manor House now in Aldershot Park. His great-great-grandson inherited the baronetcy.
 Benjamin  (circa 1586-1665), knighted in 1618 at Tichborne Park by King James I. He died without issue. Lived at West Tisted Manor where he is buried. He is reported to have fought for the Royalist cause at the Battle of Cheriton (1644) and afterwards hidden in a hollow oak tree in West Tisted.
 Henry, knighted, moved to Ireland and was involved in the Siege of Drogheda 1641.
 Elizabeth, married first Robert Garth (died 1612) (separated c. 1602)  She married secondly William Owen
 Ann, married firstly William Brock of Longwood, a descendant of the Arundells of Wardour, who intermarried with the Tichbornes several times. Ann married secondly William Timperley.
 Amphilis married Sir William Gratwicke (knighted 1607) of Ulverston, Lancashire and Tortington, Sussex.

References

1540s births
1629 deaths
Baronets in the Baronetage of England
English landowners
English MPs 1589
English MPs 1593
Gentlemen of the Privy Chamber
High Sheriffs of Hampshire
People from the City of Winchester
Tichborne baronets